"I Drink Alone" is a rock song by George Thorogood and the Destroyers. It was released as a single from the 1985 album Maverick. The song describes a man who, as the name of the song suggests, spends most of his time alone drinking. It name-checks various alcoholic beverages - Wiser's (or alternately Budweiser), Jack Daniel's, Jim Beam, Johnnie Walker (Black and Red Labels), and Old Grand-Dad - in the verses. (In some live versions, the Old Grand-Dad verse is replaced with a verse referencing Wild Turkey.) It peaked at number 13 on the Hot Mainstream Rock Tracks.

Personnel
George Thorogoodguitar, vocals
Hank Cartersaxophone
Billy Bloughbass
Jeff Simondrums

Chart performance

Notes

1985 singles
EMI America Records singles
George Thorogood songs
Songs about loneliness
Songs about alcohol
1985 songs
Song recordings produced by Terry Manning